Maida Hamad Abdallah (born December 1, 1970) is a Member of Parliament in the National Assembly of Tanzania. She has been the District Secretary of the ruling Chama Cha Mapinduzi party since 2005. She is also the District Secretary of the Tanzania Parents Association.

References

1970 births
Living people
Chama Cha Mapinduzi politicians

Members of the National Assembly (Tanzania)
21st-century Tanzanian women politicians